Leslie Joseph James (29 June 1890 – 22 October 1917), also known as "Jack James", was an Australian rules footballer who played with Geelong in the Victorian Football League.

He was killed in action in World War I. He died on the Passchendaele salient in 1917.

Family

Fifth of the eighth children of Joseph James (1856-1902), and Martha James (1857-1930), née Smith, Leslie Joseph James was born at Geelong on 29 June 1890.

He married Alice May Ward (1888-1963) in 1913. They had two children: Leslie Thomas James (1913-1979), and Iris May James (1915-1993).

Two of his brothers, Frederick William "Fred" James (1884-1948) and Sydney Harold "Syd" James (1898-1969), also played with Geelong: Fred, played two games in 1908, and Syd played four games in 1919.

Football
He played 72 senior games with Geelong.

Death
He was killed in action on 22 October 1917.

See also
 List of Victorian Football League players who died in active service

Footnotes

References

 First World War Nominal Roll, Private Leslie Joseph James (7117), 14th Australian Infantry Battalion, Australian War Memorial.
 World War I Service Record: Leslie Joseph James (7117).
 Roll of Honour: Private Leslie Joseph James (7117), Australian War Memorial.
 374th Casualty List: Victorian Details Shown: Killed in Action, The (Melbourne) Herald, (Saturday, 22 December 1917), p.12.
 Holmesby, Russell & Main, Jim (2007). The Encyclopedia of AFL Footballers. 7th ed. Melbourne: Bas Publishing.
 Main, J. & Allen, D., "James, Les", pp.88-90 in Main, J. & Allen, D., Fallen – The Ultimate Heroes: Footballers Who Never Returned From War, Crown Content, (Melbourne), 2002.

External links
 
 
 Les James, at Boyles Football Photos.

1890 births
1917 deaths
Geelong Football Club players
Australian rules footballers from Geelong
Australian military personnel killed in World War I
Military personnel from Victoria (Australia)